Hathifushi as a place name may refer to:
 Hathifushi (Haa Alif Atoll) (Republic of Maldives)
 Hathifushi (Thaa Atoll) (Republic of Maldives)